Yam Rural District is a rural district (dehestan) in Meshkan District, Khoshab County, Razavi Khorasan Province, Iran. It was split-off from Darreh Yam Rural District, which was subsequently renamed Meshkan Rural District). The rural district's population (as of the 2006 census), was 5,905, in 1,547 families. The rural district has 25 villages.

References

Rural Districts of Razavi Khorasan Province
Khoshab County